Mark Adrian Roe (born 20 February 1963) is an English Tournament professional golfer, short game coach and golfing analyst for Sky Sports.  
Roe won worldwide respect for the way he handled being disqualified from the 2003 Open Championship for a scorecard error.

Roe played for 22 years and 524 events on the European Tour between 1985 and 2006, winning three tournaments and over £2 million in prize money. He reached number 40 in the world rankings. Later, he achieved success as a short game coach, working with 3 major champions and two world No 1 golfers. He is currently a highly respected analyst and  golfing pundit for Sky Sports and continues to coach private clients around the world.

Personal life
Roe was born in Sheffield. At school he was a gymnast , trampolinist and spring board and high-board diving champion but suffered a perforated eardrum, and while convalescing he took up golf after caddying for his father Gordon.

Career
A former England and Great Britain Boy international Golfer Roe turned professional in 1981 and became a member of the European Tour in 1985 having been successful at the final qualifying school at his fourth attempt. He won three times on the tour, his first victory was wire to wire seeing off José Maria Olazabal by a single shot to win the Catalan Open and his best season  on the European Tour was 9th in the order of merit ( now Race to Dubai )  which he achieved in 1994 when he won the oldest continental championship the Open De France . He had several other top 10 finishes during the season .
His season was curtailed due to a freak accident during the pro am at the British masters . Roe was struck in the forehead by an errant tee shot during the Wednesday pro am and suffered poor vision for several months .

Roe represented England in the Alfred Dunhill Cup in 1994, and in the World Cup in 1989, 1994 and 1995.

Roe retired from tournament golf in 2006, signing off with a 67 on the Old Course at St Andrews in the final round of the Dunhill Links Championship. He now works as a commentator for Sky Sports. He is also a worldwide respected coach, specialising on the short game,(www.markroe.info) and counts Lee Westwood Francesco Molinari , Justin Rose , Nicolas Colsaerts and Ross Fisher amongst many on the list of world class players he has helped.

Accidents
In 1995 Roe was hit on the head by a stray golf ball which resulted in severe headaches. In July 1999 he tore ligaments in the ring and little fingers of his left hand after grabbing the collar of his dog, which resulted in 20 months out of the game.

2003 Open Championship
Roe was just two strokes off the lead after the third round of the 2003 Open Championship when he was disqualified. He and his playing partner, Jesper Parnevik, had failed to swap their scorecards before play, meaning that both players had ended up signing for the wrong scores which resulted in their automatic disqualification. The sport's governing body, The R&A, have since changed the rules, and failure to exchange scorecards no longer results in disqualification. Roe commented at a later date that he "handled the situation in a way that his Father would have been proud of him" and that "he welcomed the rule change so that any other player may not have face to the rollercoaster of emotion that he had to endure on Open Championship Saturday at Royal St George’s in 2003."

Professional wins (3)

European Tour wins (3)

Results in major championships

Note: Roe never played in the PGA Championship.

CUT = missed the half-way cut
DQ = Disqualified
"T" = tied

Team appearances
Amateur
Jacques Léglise Trophy (representing Great Britain & Ireland): 1980 (winners)

Professional
World Cup (representing England): 1989, 1994, 1995
Dunhill Cup (representing England): 1994

References

External links

English male golfers
European Tour golfers
Sportspeople from Sheffield
Living people
1963 births